The Women's points race was held on 21 October 2011. 24 riders participated, the distance was 25 km (100 laps) with a sprint every 10 laps for extra points. A lap would have gotten 20 points.

Medalists

Results
The race was held at 21:14.

References

2011 European Track Championships
European Track Championships – Women's points race